Meyer Mishkin (February 18, 1912 – October 9, 1999) was a Hollywood agent. His clients included Jeff Chandler, Richard Dreyfuss, Tom Skerritt, Lee Marvin, Jim Davis, Marvin Kaplan, and Gary Busey. He was credited with helping discover Tyrone Power, Gregory Peck, Jeff Chandler, Richard Dreyfuss, Charles Bronson, and James Coburn.

References

1999 deaths
Hollywood talent agents
1912 births